Henry Thielberg (1833–?) was a Union Navy sailor in the American Civil War who received the U.S. military's highest decoration, the Medal of Honor, for his actions at the Battle of Suffolk.

Born in 1833 in Germany, Thielberg gave Dudley, Massachusetts, as his home of record when he joined the Navy. Thielberg voluntarily exposed himself to heavy fire in order to surveil the Confederate forces. For this action, he was awarded the Medal of Honor three months later on July 10, 1863.

Thielberg's official Medal of Honor citation reads:
Serving temporarily on board the U.S.S. Mount Washington during the Nansemond River action, 14 April 1863. After assisting in hauling up and raising the flagstaff, Thielberg volunteered to go up on the pilothouse and observe the movements of the enemy and although 3 shells struck within a few inches of his head, remained at his post until ordered to descend.

References 

1833 births
Year of death missing
People from Dudley, Massachusetts
People of Massachusetts in the American Civil War
Union Navy sailors
United States Navy Medal of Honor recipients
American Civil War recipients of the Medal of Honor
German-born Medal of Honor recipients
German emigrants to the United States